Antoaneta is a Bulgarian given name. Notable people with this name include the following:

Antoaneta Boneva (born 1986), Bulgarian shooter
Antoaneta Frenkeva (born 1971), Bulgarian swimmer
Antoaneta Pandjerova (born 1977), Bulgarian tennis player
Antoaneta Rakhneva (born 1962), Bulgarian gymnast
Antoaneta Stefanova (born 1979), Bulgarian chess player
Antoaneta Strumenlieva (born 1968), Bulgarian swimmer
Antoaneta Todorova (born 1963), Bulgarian javelin athlete
Antoaneta Vassileva (born 1960), Bulgarian economist

See also

Antoneta Papapavli